La-related protein 1 (LARP1) is a 150 kDa protein that in humans is encoded by the LARP1 gene. LARP1 is a novel target of the mammalian target of rapamycin complex 1 (mTORC1) signaling pathway, a circuitry often hyperactivated in cancer which regulates cell growth and proliferation primarily through the regulation of protein synthesis.

Function 

LARP1 is the largest of a 7-member family of LARP proteins (others are: LARP1B, LARP3 (aka genuine La or SSB), LARP4A, LARP4B, LARP6 and LARP7). All LARP proteins, including human LARPs, contain 2 conserved regions. The first conserved region shares homology with La proteins (called the La motif, see SSB) whereas the second conserved region (called the LA- motif) is restricted to LARP proteins. LARP1 and 1B also contain a conserved "DM15 region" within their C-terminus. This region is unique and has been shown to be required for RNA-binding. Mouse Larp1 is expressed in dorsal root ganglia and spinal cord, as well as in developing organs characterized by epithelial-mesenchymal interactions. Human LARP1 is present at low levels in normal, non-embryonic cells but is highly expressed in epithelial cancers (such as ovarian, colorectal, prostate, non-small cell lung, hepatocellular and cervical cancers). Some studies have shown that high levels of LARP1 protein correlate with worse prognosis in cancer patients.

LARP1 binds to and regulates the translation of terminal oligopyrimidine motif (TOP mRNAs) and can directly interact with the 5' cap of mRNAs. It has also been shown to interact with the 3' end and coding regions (CDS) of other genes. LARP1 protein colocalizes with stress granules and P-bodies, which function in RNA storage and degradation. It has been suggested that LARP1 functions in P-bodies to attenuate the abundance of conserved Ras-MAPK mRNAs. The cluster of LARP1 homologs may function to control the expression of key developmental regulators.

Several studies have demonstrated that LARP1 deficiency selectively affects the recruitment of TOP mRNAs to polysomes. In some cancer cells, LARP1 deficiency reduces proliferation and activates apoptotic cell death. Even though a decrease abundance of proteins encoded by TOP mRNAs has been reported in LARP1 silenced cells, some researchers believe that this can be explained simply by the reduced number of TOP mRNA transcripts in LARP1-deficient cells.

References

Further reading